the Ncheni type haplochromis (Dimidiochromis dimidiatus)  is a species of freshwater fish in the family Cichlidae. It was formerly placed in the genus Haplochromis and is known in the aquarium fish trade.

It is endemic to Lake Malawi being found in Malawi, Mozambique, and Tanzania.

References

Ncheni type haplochromis
Fish described in 1864
Taxa named by Albert Günther
Taxonomy articles created by Polbot